André Alfred Brunaud (9 February 1915 – 24 May 2007) was a French wrestler. He competed at the 1948 Summer Olympics and the 1952 Summer Olympics.

References

External links
 

1915 births
2007 deaths
French male sport wrestlers
Olympic wrestlers of France
Wrestlers at the 1948 Summer Olympics
Wrestlers at the 1952 Summer Olympics
People from Saint-Marcellin, Isère
Sportspeople from Isère